No Bragging Rights is an American melodic hardcore band from Riverside, California formed in 1999 by vocalist Mike Perez. To date they have released five albums and two EPs.

History

Beginning (1999–2004)
No Bragging Rights was formed by vocalist Mike Perez when he was at the age of fifteen. They released several demo recordings between 2001 and 2004.  These recordings include "Never Again Demo" (2001), "The Razor Apologies" EP (2002), and "Waking Angel Demo" (2004). Ryan Sievers, Jose Mendoza, Anthony McCabe, Cody Henderson, Jamieson Stuart, and Chris Williams have all been credited for taking part in recording said releases. After several lineup changes they decided to pursue a more melodic hardcore and punk influenced sound.

2005–present 
In 2005, No Bragging Rights began writing their first full-length album titled "Because You Believe in Something Beyond Them" which was self-released in early 2006. This album was well received in the local music scene of Southern California and helped to establish the band outside of their hometown. Shortly after, "The Anatomy of a Martyr" EP was self-released in the summer of 2007, and brought No Bragging Rights to the national stage. This album was later re-released by Stand By Records.
 
Relentless "do it yourself" touring widened the band's fan base and attracted the attention of Pure Noise Records. The label re-released "The Anatomy of a Martyr" in 2008, and debuted the full-length album "The Consequences of Dreams" in early 2009. That year No Bragging Rights played in the Taste of Chaos 2009 tour appearance at The House of Blues, in San Diego, California, with Bring Me the Horizon and several other bands.

The following year they released two singles titled "Passion Vs. Fashion" and "Unafraid to Burn". "Passion Vs. Fashion" was released on the compilation album "Vans 2010 Warped Tour Compilation." "Unafraid to Burn" was released on the "Atticus V" compilation album  In January 2011, No Bragging Rights released a full length titled Illuminator through BlkHeart Group They continue to tour the country, promoting their latest album, and have played with many big label bands such as Asking Alexandria, Emmure, and Carnifex.

On March 30, 2011, AMP posted an interview with Christian Lee and Handsome Rick.

On July 19, 2011 bassist Rick McDonald announced his departure from the group and had the following to say:

“The decision to part ways with NBR has not been an easy one. Throughout the last 4 years of touring I’ve made so many friends and have had experiences that will give me a lifetime of memories to share. I’ve decided to take my hobby in graphic design to the next level and go full time with it, leaving no room for NBR’s non-stop tour schedule. I still love everyone in the band (except Daniel =P) and will continue to help and support them all the way to the top.”

The band will be joined by fill-in bassist Ryan “Beard” Warrell (ex: To Something Beautiful, A Thorn For Every Heart etc.) for their upcoming Beautiful and Spineless Headline Tour and future dates until a permanent replacement is found.

Band members 
 Mike Perez - vocals (1999–present)
 Martin Alcedo - drums (2005–present)
 Daniel Garrow - guitars (2008–present)
 Anthony 'Tron' Laur - guitars (2021-present)

Notable ex-members 
 Ryan Sievers - original bassist (1999-2005)
 Michael Portales (2004)
 Chris Williams - guitar (2004-2008)
 Jason Martin - bass (2005-2007)
 "Handsome" Rick - bass (2007-2011)
 Christian Lee - guitars (2005–2021)
 Ryan Warrell - bass (2012–2021)

Discography

Albums 
 Because You Believe In Something Beyond Them (2006)
 The Consequence Of Dreams (2009)
 Illuminator (2011)
 Cycles (2012)
 The Concrete Flower (2014)

EPs 
 "The Anatomy Of A Martyr" (2007)
 "No Bragging Rights" (2021)

Singles 
 "Passion Vs. Fashion" (2010)
 "Unafraid To Burn" (2010)

Videography 
 "Because You Believe In Something Beyond Them" (2006)
 "A Shot To End This All" (2009)
 "Unafraid To Burn" (2010)
 "Empire: Disarray" (2011)
 "Hope Theory" (2012)
 "Repeater" (2012)
 "Legacy" (2013)
 "Brave Hearts" (2015)
 "Outdated" (2015)

References

External links 
 Official Page
 Official Website

Melodic hardcore musical groups from California
Musical groups established in 1999
Pure Noise Records artists
Hardcore punk groups from California
1999 establishments in California